USS Gazelle is a name used more than once by the U.S. Navy:

 , was a side-wheel steamer commissioned February 1864
 Gazelle (BAM-17), was transferred to the United Kingdom 28 July 1943. Returned to the United States December 1946, she was struck from the Navy List 10 June 1947
 , was an auxiliary oiler commissioned 29 November 1943

United States Navy ship names